Here Comes Peter Cottontail is a 1971 Easter stop motion animated television special produced by Rankin/Bass Productions, currently distributed by Universal Television and based on the 1957 novel The Easter Bunny That Overslept by Priscilla and Otto Friedrich. The special also features Steve Nelson and Jack Rollins' Easter song "Here Comes Peter Cottontail".

It was originally broadcast on April 4, 1971, on the ABC television network in the United States. In later years, it has appeared on CBS, Fox Family, and The CW. In 2005, it was followed by a computer-animated sequel, Here Comes Peter Cottontail: The Movie.

Plot
Peter Cottontail is a young Easter Bunny who lives in April Valley where all the other Easter bunnies live and work, making Easter candy, sewing bonnets, and of course, decorating and delivering Easter eggs.

Colonel Wellington B. Bunny, the retiring Chief Easter Bunny, names Peter his successor, despite his boasting, irresponsibility, and lying. Peter, who has dreamed of being the Chief Easter Bunny almost his entire life, gladly accepts. However, an evil bunny named January Q. Irontail, who lives all alone except for his bat Montressor also wants to become Chief Easter Bunny, only so he can ruin Easter for children as revenge after a child once roller-skated over his tail, forcing him to wear a prosthetic one made of iron.  Irontail demands that Colonel Bunny hold a contest to see who delivers the most eggs, according to the Constitution of April Valley. Peter accepts the challenge, but stays up all night, partying with his friends. Although he tells his rooster Ben to wake him up at 5:30 in the morning, Irontail sneaks into his house and feeds the rooster magic bubblegum, sealing his beak and Peter sleeps on, not hearing the crows from the popping bubbles. Though Irontail tries all day long to deliver eggs with unsuccessful results, he is only able to deliver one single egg. However, it's still one egg more than Peter delivered, so Irontail becomes the new Chief Easter Bunny, passing laws to make Easter a disaster, such as painting eggs brown and gray, ordering the candy sculptors to make chocolate tarantulas and octopuses instead of bunnies and chicks, and having Easter galoshes instead of bonnets. Meanwhile, Peter, ashamed that his bragging led to this tragedy, leaves April Valley in disgrace until he meets Seymour S. Sassafras (The narrator), an eccentric peddler and inventor, who supplies April Valley with the colors to paint the eggs with from his Garden of Surprises, from red, white, and blue cabbages and purple corn to striped tomatoes and orange string beans. Sassafras then lets Peter use his Yestermorrowbile, a time machine piloted by a caterpillar named Antoine, Sassafras' assistant who will take Peter back to Easter to deliver his eggs, win the contest, and defeat Irontail. Unfortunately, Irontail finds out about Peter's plan and sends his spider to sabotage the Yestermorrowbile's controls, allowing Peter and Antoine to go to any holiday but Easter.

Since the rules of the contest don't specifically say that the eggs must be delivered only on Easter, Peter tries to give his eggs away at other holidays, but without success. On the 4th of July, Peter paints the eggs red, white and blue and lies to two boys by passing them off as firecrackers, which ultimately fails. Then, on Halloween, Peter meets a witch named Madame Esmeralda and gives her a Halloween egg as a gift, making the score a tie. When she calls the other Halloween inhabitants, Irontail sends Montressor out to steal Peter's eggs. After getting the eggs back, Peter tells Antoine they have to get back to Halloween, but they can't go back since Antoine has to land the craft to fix it. After failing to give any of his eggs away on Thanksgiving, Peter and Antoine go to Christmas Eve where Peter, dressed as Santa Claus, tries to give his Christmas eggs on the streets, which are completely deserted. Then Peter hears sobbing from a nearby hat shop where he meets Bonnie, an Easter bonnet who had left April Valley years ago. Bonnie's sad that nobody wants to buy her, so Peter tells the shopkeeper that he'll trade his Christmas eggs for Bonnie. Unfortunately, Irontail steals them again and Peter and Bonnie go after him, accidentally leaving Antoine behind. During the chase, Irontail and Montresor crash into Santa's sleigh where Santa demands Irontail give the eggs back to Peter. Santa returns the eggs, but Peter is too sad to thank him since they left Antoine behind. Afterwards, Peter and Bonnie are unable to land on New Year's Day but land on Valentine's Day where Peter meets a beautiful female bunny named Donna and he gives her a Valentine egg. However, Irontail finds the eggs and casts a spell on them, turning them all green, inside and out.

After failing to give the green eggs away on Presidents' Day, Peter vows to be more honest and responsible. He and Bonnie end up landing in the middle of St. Patrick's Day, which gives Peter another chance to give away his eggs — this time, Peter's successful and wins the contest, finally becoming the Chief Easter Bunny. Antoine returns as a butterfly and Irontail works as the janitor of April Valley while Peter leads a parade with all the characters from the story.

Cast
The special featured the following cast members:

Production

Peter Cottontail was Danny Kaye’s last film. a posthumous memorial not only on Kaye's career as a performer but also his work as the symbol of UNICEF.

Soundtrack
Although not commercially released, a soundtrack album for the special was released for demonstration purposes by ABC.

Here Comes Peter Cottontail – Seymour S. Sassafrass
The Easter Bunny Never Sleeps – Colonel Wellington B. Bunny, Chorus
The Easter Bunny Always Sleeps (Irontail's reprise; the diabolical version of The Easter Bunny Never Sleeps) – Irontail
If I Could Only Get Back to Yesterday – Seymour S. Sassafrass, Chorus
When You Can't Get It All Together, Improvise – Antoine, Peter Cottontail, Chorus
Be Mine Today – Peter Cottontail, Donna, Chorus
In The Puzzle of Life – Seymour S. Sassafrass, Chorus
Here Comes Peter Cottontail (reprise) – Seymour S. Sassafrass, Chorus

Crew
 Producers/Directors – Jules Bass, Arthur Rankin, Jr.
 Teleplay – Romeo Muller
 Music and Lyrics – Jules Bass, Maury Laws
 Based on "Here Comes Peter Cottontail" – Steve Nelson/Jack Rollins © 1949 Hill & Range Songs, Inc.
 Based on "The Easter Bunny That Overslept" – Priscilla and Otto Friedrich © 1957 Lothrop, Lee & Shepard Company
 Illustration – Adrienne Adams
 Character Design – Paul Coker, Jr.
 Continuity Design – Steve Nakagawa
 Editorial Supervisor – Irwin Goldress
 Sound and Effects Recording – John Boyd, Jim Harris
 "Animagic" Supervision – Kizo Nagashima
 Character Model Sculptor – Ichiro Komuro (uncredited)
 Animators – Yutaka Mikome (uncredited), Takeo Nakamura, Hiroshi Tabata
 Musical Director – Maury Laws

Home media releases
Despite the acclaim such as TV Guide's comment that the special had "one of the best scores in children's special history," no original soundtrack album was ever released commercially. ABC and Rankin/Bass did produce a private vinyl LP pressing of the entire soundtrack recording in 1971, but no record company has released an official, legitimate audio version to date.

On video, the special has seen multiple releases in various formats. In 1990, 1992, 1993, 1998, and 2002, it was released on VHS by Family Home Entertainment and Sony Wonder. It has also seen the following releases on DVD:
February 12, 2002 (Sony Wonder)
February 15, 2005 (Sony Wonder)
February 10, 2009 (Genius Products)
February 18, 2014 (DreamWorks Animation)

The 2014 release is the first to include the sequel, Here Comes Peter Cottontail: The Movie.

A Blu-ray was released by DreamWorks on February 22, 2019 as a Wal-Mart exclusive, containing a heavily edited version that runs nearly ten minutes shorter. This same release was extended beyond Wal-Mart to all media retailers in 2020 with the same edited version.

See also
 The First Easter Rabbit (1976 Rankin-Bass traditional animated special)
 The Easter Bunny Is Comin' to Town (1977 Rankin-Bass stop-motion special)
 List of animated feature films
 List of stop-motion films

References

External links

 

American Broadcasting Company television specials
1970s animated television specials
American children's animated fantasy films
American children's films
American musical fantasy films
1971 television specials
1970s American television specials
Rankin/Bass Productions television specials
Stop-motion animated television shows
DreamWorks Classics franchises
Films scored by Maury Laws
Television shows directed by Jules Bass
Television shows directed by Arthur Rankin Jr.
Easter television specials
Television shows written by Romeo Muller
Musical television specials
1970s musical fantasy films
Easter Bunny in television
1970s English-language films